Cease may refer to:

 CEASE therapy, a purported treatment for autism
 Cease (surname), a surname